Zhang Jianhua (born September 1964) is a Chinese politician currently serving as director of the National Energy Administration. He has over 30 years of working experience in China's petroleum and petrochemical industry. He is a delegate to the 19th National Congress of the Chinese Communist Party and a member of the 19th Central Discipline Commission of the Chinese Communist Party.

Early life 
Zhang was born in Shanghai in September 1964.

Career 
Zhang entered the workforce in July 1986, and joined the Chinese Communist Party in August 1994.

Petroleum and petrochemical industry
He joined the Shanghai Gaoqiao Petrochemical Company in 1986, becoming chief economic manager in May 1995 and assistant manager in April 1999. He worked at the SINOPEC Shanghai Gaoqiao Branch between February 2000 and April 2003, what he was promoted to assistant manager in February 2000 and to manager in September 2000. In April 2003 he was promoted to become vice-president of the Sinopec. In February 2005 he was promoted again to become a party member of the China Petrochemical Corporation. In October 2016 he was appointed vice-president of the China National Petroleum Corporation and two years later was elevated to the CEO position.

Politics
On December 5, 2018, he was appointed director of the National Energy Administration, replacing Nur Bekri.

References

External links
  Curriculum vitae of Zhang Jianhua 

1964 births
East China University of Science and Technology alumni
Living people
People's Republic of China politicians from Shanghai
Chinese Communist Party politicians from Shanghai